Kerzhakov is a Russian surname. Notable people with the surname include:

 Aleksandr Kerzhakov (born 1982), Russian footballer
 Mikhail Kerzhakov (born 1987), Russian footballer

Russian-language surnames